Rasul is a village and Union Council of Mandi Bahauddin District in the Punjab province of Pakistan. It has an altitude of 233m (767 feet). Rasul is a river crossing on the Jhelum River. The town has a university named University of Engineering and Technology, Rasul and a power station.

References

Populated places in Mandi Bahauddin District
Union councils of Mandi Bahauddin District